Noble-Contrée is a municipality in the district of Sierre in the canton of Valais in Switzerland. On 1 January 2021 the former municipalities of Miège, Venthône and Veyras merged to form the new municipality of Noble-Contrée.

History

Miège
Miège is first mentioned in 1226 as Mieio.  The municipality was formerly known by its German name Miesen, however, that name is no longer used.

Venthône

Veyras

Geography

Demographics

Historic Population
The historical population is given in the following chart:

Heritage sites of national significance

The Tower in Venthône listed as Swiss heritage site of national significance.  The entire village of Venthône is part of the Inventory of Swiss Heritage Sites.

References

External links

Municipalities of Valais
Cultural property of national significance in Valais